Francesco Vaccaro (born 26 March 1999) is an Italian professional footballer who plays as a left back for Serie D club Avezzano.

Club career
Vaccaro started his career in Virtus Lanciano academy and Bari between 2016 and 2017. He made his professional debut for Serie D club Potenza on 2017–18 season.

On 9 August 2019, he joined to Palermo.

On 1 September 2021, Vaccaro signed for Mantova.

Since 9 September 2022 he is a player of Avezzano, Serie D club.

References

External links
 

1999 births
Living people
Sportspeople from Pescara
Footballers from Abruzzo
Italian footballers
Association football defenders
Serie C players
Serie D players
S.S.C. Bari players
Potenza Calcio players
Palermo F.C. players
U.S. Città di Pontedera players
Mantova 1911 players
Avezzano Calcio players